Epischura is a genus of copepods in the family Temoridae.

Species

The following species are recognised in the genus Epischura:

Epischura fluviatilis Herrick, 1883
Epischura lacustris S. A. Forbes, 1882
Epischura massachusettsensis Pearse, 1906
Epischura nevadensis Lilljeborg, 1889
Epischura nordenskioldi Lilljeborg, 1889
Epischura smirnovi Borutsky, 1961
Epischura udylensis Borutsky, 1947
Epischura vagans Pickering, 1844
Epischura baikalensis G. O. Sars, 1900
Epischura chankensis Rylov, 1928

It has recently been proposed that Epischura is parapheletic with respect to Heterocope and that the Siberian species, Epischura baikalensis and Epischurella chankensis, be moved to the ressurrected genus Epischurella.

References

Temoridae
Taxonomy articles created by Polbot
Copepod genera
Taxa named by Stephen Alfred Forbes